Loropetalum subcordatum is a species of plant in the Hamamelidaceae family. It is found in China and Hong Kong. Previously considered a separate genus, Tetrathyrium,  Loropetalum subcordatum is one of four species of Loropetalum, and is placed in tribe Loropetaleae, subfamily Hamamelidoideae, family Hamamelidaceae of the Saxifragales. Its conservation status is considered vulnerable.

References

Bibliography 

 
 
 

Hamamelidaceae
Flora of Hong Kong
Flora of China
Vulnerable plants
Taxonomy articles created by Polbot
Taxa named by Daniel Oliver